Clas is a masculine given name. Notable people with the name include:

 Clas Alströmer (1736–1794), Swedish naturalist
 Clas Bjerkander (1735–1795), Swedish meteorologist, botanist and entomologist
 Clas or Klaus Fleming (1535-1597), Finnish-born Swedish nobleman and admiral, Lord High Admiral and Lord High Constable
 Clas Larsson Fleming (1592-1644), an admiral and administrator of the Royal Swedish Navy
 Clas Frietzcky (1727–1803), Swedish politician
 Clas Lindberg (born 1956), Swedish film director and screenwriter
 Clas Theodor Odhner (1836-1904), Swedish historian and director of the Swedish National Archives
 Clas Thunberg (1893-1973), Finnish speed skater and five time Olympic gold medalist
 Clas Åkesson Tott (c. 1530–1590), Swedish field marshal and member of the Privy Council of Sweden

See also
Claes

Swedish masculine given names